opened in 1995 in Nanao, Ishikawa Prefecture, Japan. The main art gallery on the Noto Peninsula, the collection includes works by Hasegawa Tōhaku.

See also
 Ishikawa Prefectural Museum of Art
 List of Cultural Properties of Japan - paintings (Ishikawa)

References

External links
  Ishikawa Nanao Art Museum
  Ishikawa Nanao Art Museum Collection Database

Museums in Ishikawa Prefecture
Art museums and galleries in Japan
Art museums established in 1995
1995 establishments in Japan
Nanao, Ishikawa